Helcogramma trigloides, the scarf triplefin, is a species of triplefin blenny in the genus Helcogramma. It was described by Pieter Bleeker in 1858 as Tripterygion trigloides. This is a widespread species in the western Pacific Ocean.

References

trigloides
Fish described in 1858